The 2004 Canberra Women's Classic was a women's tennis tournament played on outdoor hard courts at the National Sports Club in Canberra, Australia and was part of the Tier V category of the 2004 WTA Tour. It was the fourth edition of the tournament and was held from 11 through 17 January 2004. Second-seeded Paola Suárez won the singles title, after surviving five matchpoints in the final, and earned $16,000 first-prize money.

Finals

Singles

 Paola Suárez defeated  Silvia Farina Elia 3–6, 6–4, 7–6(7–5)
 It was Suárez' 1st singles title of the year and the 4th and last of her career.

Doubles

 Jelena Kostanić /  Claudine Schaul defeated  Caroline Dhenin /   Lisa McShea 6–4, 7–6(7–3)

References

External links
 ITF tournament edition details
 Tournament draws

Canberra International
Canberra International
Canberra International